The Roman Catholic Archdiocese of Passo Fundo is an archdiocese located in the city of Passo Fundo. Before being elevated to an archdiocese itself in 2011 it was part of the Ecclesiastical province of Porto Alegre in Brazil.

History 
 March 10, 1951: Established as Diocese of Passo Fundo from the Diocese of Santa Maria
 April 13, 2011: Elevated to archdiocese

Bishops

Ordinaries, in reverse chronological order
 Archbishops of Passo Fundo (Roman rite), below
Archbishop Rodolfo Luís Weber (2015.12.2 - Present)
Archbishop Antonio Carlos Altieri (2012.07.11 - 2015.12.2); formerly, Bishop of Caraguatatuba 
Archbishop Pedro Ercílio Simon (see below 2011.04.13 – 2012.07.11)
 Bishops of Passo Fundo (Roman rite), below
 Bishop Pedro Ercílio Simon (1999.05.19 – 2011.04.13 see above)
 Bishop Urbano José Allgayer (1982.02.04 – 1999.05.19)
 Bishop João Cláudio Colling (1951.03.23 – 1981.08.29), appointed Archbishop of Porto Alegre

Coadjutor bishop
Pedro Ercílio Simon (1998-1999)

Auxiliary bishop
Liro Vendelino Meurer (2009-2013), appointed Bishop of Santo Ângelo, Rio Grande do Sul

Other priest of this diocese who became bishop
Osvino José Both, appointed Auxiliary Bishop of Porto Alegre, Rio Grande do Sul in 1990

Suffragan Sees 
 Diocese of Erexim
 Diocese of Frederico Westphalen
 Diocese of Vacaria

References 
 GCatholic.org
 Catholic Hierarchy
 Diocese website (Portuguese)

Roman Catholic dioceses in Brazil
Christian organizations established in 1951
Roman Catholic ecclesiastical provinces in Brazil
 
Roman Catholic dioceses and prelatures established in the 20th century
1951 establishments in Brazil